The Frightful Four are a group of fictional characters appearing in American comic books published by Marvel Comics. They serve as the antithesis to the Fantastic Four.

Publication history
The Frightful Four first appeared in Fantastic Four #36 (March 1965), and were created by Stan Lee and Jack Kirby.

The team subsequently appears in Fantastic Four #94 (January 1970), #129 (December 1972), #148 (July 1974), #177 (December 1976), Peter Parker, the Spectacular Spider-Man #42 (May 1980), The Amazing Spider-Man #214-215 (March–April 1981), Fantastic Four #326-328 (May–July 1989), Fantastic Four Unlimited #5 (March 1994), The Incredible Hulk vol. 2 #418 (June 1994), Deadpool vol. 3 #35 (December 1999), Fantastic Four vol. 3 #29 (May 2000), and Fantastic Four #514 (August 2004), and #547-549, and Superior Carnage #1-5 (2014).

The Frightful Four received an entry in The Official Handbook of the Marvel Universe Update '89 #3.

Fictional team biography
The Frightful Four first appeared in Fantastic Four #36, consisting of the Wizard, the Sandman, Paste-Pot Pete (the latter two having freed the Wizard), and Medusa (who had amnesia at the time). The villains were originally fairly successful, almost defeating the Fantastic Four during Sue and Reed's engagement party in their first appearance. They captured all the members except the Torch, who was able to free the others. The Frightful Four even stole the Fantastic Four's powers, which later almost killed them in their second appearance.

When the Fantastic Four disappeared, the Frightful Four attempted to break into the Baxter Building, but were accidentally scared off by Norse God Balder believing him to be the Human Torch.

The Wizard later used a hypnosis device on the Thing in order to make him their obedient slave, by Medusa's request. When the Fantastic Four found a lead on where Ben was, they travelled to New Jersey and were soon attacked by the Frightful Four. During the fight, the Thing arrived and attacked his former comrades. The Thing's added strength was what the Frightful Four needed to defeat the Fantastic Four, while all the members were  bound by different booby-trapped restraints. While Mister Fantastic was glued to a wall with the Trapster's paste, the Wizard convinced the Thing that Reed was responsible for his monstrous nature and convinced him to kill Reed. Human Torch and Invisible Woman managed to free themselves from their respective traps and counterattacked the Frightful Four giving Mister Fantastic enough time to free himself from Trapster's paste. However, while fighting the Thing one on one, Ben managed to catch Reed and smash him into an urn. During the fight, Johnny was captured and Sue chases after the urn with Reed inside. While the Frightful Four brainwashed Johnny, Sue freed Reed; they got a hold of a number of the Wizard's anti-gravity discs. Using them to disorientate the other Frightful Four members, they used one to make taking Ben back to base easier. However, although the other members were caught up, the Wizard and Johnny were still free and chase after Reed, Sue and Ben.

While being chased by Wizard and a mind-controlled Human Torch, Mister Fantastic and Invisible Woman managed to escape from them. The Frightful Four incapacitated the Human Torch when they found out that he was pretending to be mind-controlled. Meanwhile, Reed tried to use a device to reverse the brainwashing on Ben. Ben, however, tried to destroy the machine in order to get free, causing an explosion that exposes him to a near-lethal dose of radiation. Although it worked, and Ben was changed back to normal:  he was put in a bed to see if he would live or die. The Frightful Four then returned to the Baxter Building and attack Mister Fantastic and Invisible Woman, showing them that they had Human Torch as a hostage. However, the Thing revived just long enough to crush the Wizard's body armor, giving Human Torch the chance to free himself from the gigantic anti-gravity disc he was tied to. The Fantastic Four then easily defeated their opponents, and captured Wizard, Trapster, and Sandman. Medusa, however, managed to escape. After the three remaining members of the Frightful Four were turned over to the police, the Thing decided to rejoin the Fantastic Four with hopes that if Mister Fantastic and Invisible Woman can endure this sort of daily danger and be married, then maybe someday he could be normal again.

The Frightful Four got back together and spied on the Fantastic Four during their visit to child-rearing expert Agatha Harkness. That time, they planned to kidnap Mister Fantastic and Invisible Woman's newborn son Franklin Richards. This time, they were defeated by Agatha, who revealed to the Fantastic Four that she was also a witch.

The Wizard, Trapster, and Sandman reunited in order to look for a fourth member after Medusa regained her memories. As a result, Electro joined up with the Frightful Four. The Frightful Four prepared to attack Spider-Man after Dr. Curt Connors cured him of his Spider-Lizard form. The Frightful Four later arrived at the Statue of Liberty where Spider-Man and Human Torch met. Electro used a specially-made suit that imitated Human Torch's powers, in order to lure Spider-Man to them. Spider-Man was caught off-guard because of this and ended up overpowered. The Wizard then planned to have Trapster pose as Spider-Man and enter the Baxter Building. After Trapster's infiltration, the Frightful Four attacked the building, taking out the Fantastic Four one at a time. Although they were able to take the other three by surprise, they were defeated when Spider-Man escaped and came to Mister Fantastic's aid. Spider-Man tricked Electro into knocking out the Wizard, before he and Mister Fantastic trapped Sandman and Electro in a vacuum cleaner and a fire-hose respectively. Trapster surrendered when he was confronted by the other three Fantastic Four members after they regained consciousness.

Thing was later attacked by the Frightful Four with Thundra as their fourth member. Medusa aided the Thing only to be roped up by Trapster. They then attacked Mister Fantastic and Invisible Woman as Franklin unleashed energy that ended up awakening Thing. The latter managed to fight off the Frightful Four, who were able to get away. While away from the Frightful Four, Thundra later kidnapped Alicia Masters in order to fight Thing at Shea Stadium.

Wizard, Sandman, and Trapster reunited to hunt down the Fantastic Four after returning from Atlantis. The Fantastic Four managed to turn the tides against them.

The Frightful Four took over the Baxter Building and captured the Fantastic Four. They subsequently held an audition for a fourth member much to the disappointment of the Baxter Building's landlord Walter Collins. Texas Twister was the first to audition, but declined when he learned that they are not going to pay him for his services. Captain Ultra was another person to show up at the audition and showed off his powers only to faint when one of the Frightful Four members lit a match. Then Osprey auditioned in order for them to give him superpowers which caused Wizard to attach a hover-disk to Osprey sending him flying out of the Baxter Building. Wizard announced on the PA stating that those who did not have superpowers did not need to audition. When Tigra arrived and freed the Fantastic Four, Wizard announced that whoever can defeat them can join the Frightful Four. Out of the villains that left, only Brute remained. Brute joined the Frightful Four and assisted them in fighting the Fantastic Four.

Wizard was later freed from his prison on Ryker's Island by a mysterious person who had joined up with the villains' team. As they made their escape, the guards came after them only to be stopped by a sea monster summoned by the mysterious person. Wizard was impressed as the two head to land to hunt down Spider-Man. Wizard used a giant mechanical spider on the World Trade Center in order to draw out Spider-Man, who ended up knocking the giant mechanical spider off the World Trade Center. The device that was on the mechanical spider enabled Wizard and his ally to track down Spider-Man's spider-senses to his apartment building where they end up rounding up the tenants. Spider-Man attacked them from a different direction. After rescuing the tenants, Spider-Man went after the two. Upon meeting up with Trapster and Sandman, the mysterious ally of Wizard was revealed to be Llyra. Spider-Man learned of this when Namor came to town. Spider-Man and Namor engaged the Frightful Four and managed to defeat them.

Wizard later assembled Hydro-Man, Titania, and Klaw as the Frightful Four when attacking the Four Freedoms Plaza following Sandman's reform. During the battle, Thing regressed to his human form. The Frightful Four managed to take down the other members of the Fantastic Four as Klaw was defeated. When Dragon Man was brought in as Klaw's replacement, Thing had to rescue his teammates and stop the Frightful Four.

The Fantastic Four ended up fighting the Frightful Four that consisted of Wizard, Klaw, Red Ghost, and She-Thing.

Wizard gathered Absorbing Man, Living Laser, and Mister Hyde together as an unofficial Frightful Four. They attacked the wedding of Rick Jones and Marlo Chandler only to end up fighting the Hulk.

At some point, the Wizard assembled a Frightful Four consisting of himself, Deadpool, Taskmaster, and Constrictor as a test team.

Wizard later assembled Trapster, Dreadknight, and Man-Bull together as the Frightful Four when it came to abducting Dr. Cargill and forcing him to use his expertise for the Wizard's endeavor. They were opposed by Spider-Man, the Rangers, the Right Riders, and Dr. Cargill's daughter Turbine.

At the time when Doctor Doom switched minds with Mister Fantastic, Wizard led the Frightful Four (consisting of himself, She-Thing, Trapster, and a Punisher robot) in an attack on the Baxter Building. Due to the appearance of Doctor Doom and not knowing what happened, Wizard ordered a retreat not wanting to fight Doctor Doom.

When the Fantastic Four's reputation was damaged by their attempted coup of Latveria to destroy Doom's arsenal, the Wizard assembled a new team consisting of himself, the Trapster, Hydro-Man and his ex-wife Salamandra, seeking to take advantage of the team's current poor standing by defeating them on a live broadcast. However, with the aid of the Wizard and Salamandra's daughter Cole - who was subjected to various experiments in the womb that give her natural control of the Wizard's gravitons - the Frightful Four are defeated when Cole helps the Fantastic Four find her father's base, the Wizard subsequently trapping the Trapster in a time loop when he becomes angered at the Trapster's incompetence while Hydro-Man and Salamandra are defeated by hitting them with the Wizard's own anti-gravity discs.

Another version of the Frightful Four (consisting of Wizard, Hydro-Man, Titania, and Trapster) appears to challenge the Fantastic Four again, only to find themselves dealing with the additional presence of the Black Panther and Storm, who had temporarily joined the Fantastic Four while Reed and Sue were on a second honeymoon to work on their marriage after their separation during the "Civil War". When Klaw's body was restored to normal by Wizard and joins up with him, the group becomes the Frightful Five.

When the Thing recently got engaged, his fiancé received a wreath from the Frightful Four with a card saying "See you at the wedding."

At the time when Thing was fighting Red Hulk, a new line-up of the Frightful Four (consisting of Wizard, Klaw, Lyra, and Trapster) attacked the Baxter Building.

A flashback recalled by Spider-Man and Invisible Woman had Spider-Man pulling down Human Torch's pants before the Frightful Four (consisting of Wizard, Trapster, and Beetle) attacked them. Invisible Woman managed to pull their pants down and was arrested alongside them for indecent exposure. Lucky for her, Spider-Man and Human Torch bailed her out.

Under the orders of a mysterious benefactor, Wizard formed another incarnation of the Frightful Four consisting of Wrecker, Thunderball, and a female Bulldozer. They attacked Thing and depowered Human Torch in Times Square. During the fight to which the rest of the Fantastic Four joined, the members of the Frightful Four demonstrated increased powers with which they almost defeated the heroes until the Future Foundation replacement team led by Ant-Man arrived to help them and finally capture the villains in one of Invisible Woman's force fields until S.H.I.E.L.D. arrived. As the Frightful Four were being taken into S.H.I.E.L.D. custody, Wizard revealed that the attack had been financed by a bigger enemy, and that they did their part.

Wizard's mind began to shows signs of dementia, due to punishment inflicted by Black Bolt, so he decided to create a new Frightful Four with Klaw, Karl Malus, and Carnage. He attempted to control Kletus Kassidy's mind, but due to his lobotomization, he could not. He instead transferred his blood into Malus and made him into Superior Carnage. Wizard's goal was to take over NYC City Hall and impress his son, but Superior Spider-Man was able to stop him.

Wizard was later freed by the same individual who financed his attack and gave him more resources to reform the Frightful Four. Using Gazelle, Reptilla, and Vertigo of Salem's Seven, Wizard attacked Chicago to get the attention of Mister Fantastic. Mister Fantastic was almost defeated by the Frightful Four until Scarlet Witch appeared to help him. However, after witnessing the scale of the Quiet Man's plans for revenge- coupled with the 'betrayal' of his clone Bently- the Wizard led the new Frightful Four of himself, She-Thing, Thundra and Sandman against the Quiet Man's invasion, concluding that this was not a world he wanted for his son.

After Deadpool failed to deliver Dracula's bride Shiklah in time, Dracula created a literal Frightful Four consisting of Brood mercenary Xzax, Marcus the Centaur, N'Kantu, the Living Mummy, and Frankenstein's Monster. Except for Frankenstein's Monster, the entire team was killed by Deadpool.

Membership
First appearing in Fantastic Four #36, and led by the Wizard, the team was put together to fight against the Fantastic Four.

Wannabees
The wannabees were a group of superhumans who gathered in response to an advertisement to join the team.

 Captain Ultra
 Osprey
 Texas Twister

Other versions

Earth-98
An alternate universe Frightful Four consisted of Wizard, Blastaar, Quicksand and the Hooded Haunt.

Marvel 1602
The Marvel 1602 miniseries 1602: The Fantastick Four includes the Four Who Are Frightful, comprising Jacobean versions of the four original members. This version was created by Peter David.

 The Sandman resembles his Earth-616 counterpart, except for pale skin and glowing eyes, and can conjure up nightmares. This is a reference to another comic book Sandman that was also created by 1602 originator Neil Gaiman.
 Medusa has snakes for hair, and can turn men to stone like her namesake.
 The Trapster wears forester's clothes, and is described by the Wizard as an "expert huntsman".
 The Wizard, in addition to seeing himself as the greatest scientist of the period, is also an actual magic-user.

They joined up with Otto Von Doom when they stated that they have been to Bensaylum (the Earth-311 version of Atlantis) even when Otto had the Vulture-Fliers abduct William Shakespeare to be his chronicler. They were opposed by the Four from the Fantastick.

Marvel Adventures
In an unidentified alternate universe visited by the Earth-20051 Human Torch in Marvel Adventures Fantastic Four #25, the Frightful Four consists of Mr. Devious (Reed Richards), the Unstoppable Woman (Susan Storm), Monsterman (Ben Grimm), and the Human Pyre (Johnny Storm). Blaming non-existent enemies for the accident that transformed them, the paranoid villains attempted to take revenge on the entire world. They are opposed by the Iron Man-like hero Doc Iron, secretly mild-mannered research scientist Victor von Doom.

Ultimate Marvel
In the Ultimate Marvel universe, the Frightful Four are zombie counterparts of the Fantastic Four from the Marvel Zombies dimension. Zombie Reed himself was the one who named his team, and he did so with a sarcastic tone. They possess all the powers of the Fantastic Four, along with many more years of experience, but are in a state of gradual decay, and a hunger for living flesh. They have repeatedly stated their goal is to spread the virus they carry on to the superhumans of the Ultimate universe.

The Four were captured upon their arrival to the Ultimate universe, and have been kept in a special holding cell designed by Mister Fantastic to contain the Hulk. They escaped in Ultimate Fantastic Four #31, tricking the guards into thinking they'd teleported out when really they had merely turned invisible. They were quarantined to the top 40 levels of the Baxter Building where they kill and eat anyone who was trapped with them. The group begin work on a portal which would allow their fellow zombies to gain access to this universe.

In Ultimate Fantastic Four #32, The Ultimates gathered at the foot of the Baxter Building as plans were made to drop the field and attack the zombies, when Mister Fantastic in Van Damme's body returned. Using the distraction of a genuine threat to Johnny via Van Damme's magical knowledge, Van Damme/Reed gains access to the building. Further using magic, he swiftly defeated the entire Frightful Four.  Reed was sent what remained of their bodies back to their dimension before switching his body back with Van Damme.

What If?
The Mike Wieringo tribute issue What If This was the FF?, showed a world where the new Fantastic Four consisting of Spider-Man, Wolverine, Ghost Rider, and the Hulk remained a team due to the death of their predecessors. Doctor Doom attempted to destroy them and hence the legacy of the original FF by enlisting the aid of Mephisto to empower a new Frightful Four with demonic energies, the new team consisting of Sandman, Venom, Sabretooth, and Abomination only for all four to die during the fight due to the demonic energy Mephisto had placed within them.

In other media
 The Frightful Four appears in a self-titled episode of The New Fantastic Four, consisting of the Wizard, Trapster, Medusa, and the Sandman.
 The Frightful Four appears in the Fantastic Four episode "And the Wind Cries Medusa", consisting of the Wizard, Trapster, Medusa, and Hydro-Man.
 The Frightful Four appears in the Fantastic Four: World's Greatest Heroes episode "Frightful", consisting of the Wizard, Trapster, Klaw, and Dragon Man. This version of the team masqueraded as a team of superheroes called the "Wizard's Four" to gain New York City's trust and eventually break into a university to steal unstable molecules that Mister Fantastic donated, though they are eventually exposed and arrested.
 The Frightful Four appears in Ultimate Spider-Man, consisting of the Wizard, Klaw, Thundra, and Trapster.

References

External links
 The Frightful Four at Marvel.com
 

Characters created by Jack Kirby
Characters created by Stan Lee
Comics characters introduced in 1965
Fictional quartets
Marvel Comics supervillain teams
Marvel Comics undead characters